Edwards Hall is a 1,800-seat multi-purpose arena at Ohio Wesleyan University in Delaware, Ohio, located on Sandusky Street. It is home to the Wesleyan Battling Bishops swimming and handball teams. It was named for the late John Edwards, who served on the board of trustees of the university and was a major benefactor to the university.

In 1985, it was added to the National Register of Historic Places along with the Pfieffer Natatorium.

References

Ohio Wesleyan University buildings
Sports venues on the National Register of Historic Places in Ohio
National Register of Historic Places in Delaware County, Ohio
Sports venues completed in 1905
Athletics (track and field) venues in Ohio
College indoor track and field venues in the United States
Indoor track and field venues in the United States
Handball venues in the United States
College swimming venues in the United States
1905 establishments in Ohio